Storchodon is an extinct genus of morganucodont mammaliaforms from the Late Jurassic (Kimmeridgian) of Germany. Its only species is Storchodon cingulatus, which is known exclusively from a single upper molar found at the Süntel Formation of Lower Saxony.

Etymology 
The generic name Storchodon honours the German palaeontologist Gerhard Storch, whereas the specific epithet cingulatus is a reference to the prominent cingulum of the molar.

Description 
This large size may be a case of insular gigantism. As in other morganucodonts, the molar has a triconodont shape, with the three main cusps A, B and C being set in a straight line. Cusp D is relatively large, and unlike in for example Morganucodon, it is placed at an oblique angle relative to the main cusps.

References 

Morganucodonts
Prehistoric cynodont genera
Kimmeridgian life
Jurassic synapsids of Europe
Jurassic Germany
Fossils of Germany
Fossil taxa described in 2019
Taxa named by Alexander O. Averianov
Taxa named by Thomas Martin (paleontologist)